The Ambassador Extraordinary and Plenipotentiary of the Russian Federation to the Republic of Indonesia is the official representative of the President and the Government of Russia to the President and the Government of Indonesia. 

The ambassador and her staff work at large in the Embassy of Russia in Jakarta in Indonesia. There is a Consulate in Denpasar. The ambassador of Russia to Indonesia is concurrently accredited to East Timor, Papua New Guinea and Kiribati.

Background 

Relations between Russia and Indonesia date back to the mid-19th century when the Russian frigate Pallada visited Java and the surrounding islands. The Russian writer Ivan Goncharov was on this voyage, and described the region as "the most luxurious corner of the world." In 1869, the Russian traveller V. Tatarinov visited the island of Java, later describing his trip in Sea Collection.

The territory of present day-Indonesia was part of the Dutch East Indies, a colony of the Netherlands, from 1800 until 1942. The Japanese forces invaded in March 1942, expelled the Dutch forces, and occupied the Dutch East Indies. After the defeat and surrender of Japan in August 1945, Sukarno immediately declared the independence of Indonesia from Dutch rule on 17 August 1945. This led the Dutch to declare war on the Indonesian separatists, and attempt to re-establish colonial rule over Indonesia. After four and a half years of fighting the Netherlands formally recognized Indonesian sovereignty in December 1949. 

The Soviet Union (and later Russia) recognized Indonesian independence and established diplomatic relations in 1950.  was appointed as the first Russian ambassador to the country.

Timeline of diplomatic relations 

 22 May 1948 — Consular relations were established.
 26 January — 3 February 1950 - diplomatic relations established.
 30 November — 17 December 1953 - Diplomatic relations established at the level of embassies.

List of representatives (1954 – present)

Representatives of the Soviet Union to Indonesia (1954 – 1991)

Representatives of the Russian Federation to Indonesia (1991 – present)

See also 

 List of diplomatic missions of Russia
 Foreign relations of Indonesia
 Current Ambassadors of Russia

References

External links 

 Ambassadors of the USSR to Indonesia
 Embassy of Russia in Jakarta

Ambassadors of Russia to Indonesia
Russia
Indonesia